Ganga Bhogpur also known as "Kodia" is a village in Yamkeshwar block in Pauri Garhwal District in the Indian state of Uttarakhand.

History 
There were five people who started to build the village. Their names were Atama Ram Ringola, Lakhans Singh Kohli, Budhiram Ranakoti, Kutal Singh Bagoda and Kripal Singh Bhandari. In 1962, people were migrated from Bhogpur (Banskholi, Hathitham, Umartham, Badkatal) and were given land as much as they were owning in their native place. People were having trees of their own and government gave them water canal in the village Ganga Bhogpur. Forrest dept. at that time permitted people to use forest for their needful things.  There were only 5 family who came to this village in 1962 and later in 1966 all the people migrated from the above-mentioned village.

Geography 
Ganga Bhogpur is situated between two holy cities, Haridwar and Rishikesh along the river Ganges. Ganga Bhogpur is an entry point to Rajaji National Park.

Nearby village Chilla is another entry point to the park.

The area is covered by forest and mountains. Animals such as elephants, tigers, deer and lions in habit the area.

Infrastructure 
The village has schools, electricity, roads, resorts and markets.

Economy 
The main profession of villagers is agriculture and animal husbandry.

Demographics 
According to the 2019 census, Ganga Bhogpur has a population of 1100 across 400 houses. The female population is 75.8%. The literacy rate is 90.8% and the female literacy rate is 85.1%.

The local language is Garhwali.

The Scheduled Caste Population is 6.1%. The working population is 68.0% The 0-6 population is 75 of which 30 are female.

References 

Villages in Pauri Garhwal district